Titus Demetrius Young, Sr. (born August 21, 1989) is a former American football wide receiver. He played in the National Football League from 2011 to 2012. He was selected by the Detroit Lions in the second round of the 2011 NFL Draft. He played college football at Boise State University.

High school and college career
Young starred as a two-way wide receiver and defensive back, known as a hard hitting safety at University High School in Los Angeles before going to Boise State in 2007. He had 204 receptions for 3,063 yards and 25 touchdowns in his collegiate career—the most in school history at the time—including 71 receptions for 1,215 yards and 9 touchdowns in 2010. During a 42–7 win over the Hawaii Warriors he had a career long reception for 83 yards.

Young was frequently in trouble during his time at Boise State. He frequently missed workouts and argued with coaches. He was forced to sit out the first quarter of the 2007 Hawaii Bowl for an undisclosed violation of team rules. On October 11, 2008, Broncos coach Chris Petersen suspended Young for at least three games, again for an undisclosed violation of team rules. Two weeks later, Petersen extended the suspension indefinitely; in Petersen's words, Young and the Broncos "just need some time apart." He didn't play again for the rest the season.

Professional career

Draft
Young declared himself eligible for the 2011 NFL Draft. Despite his considerable talent, concerns about his behavior (one pre-draft training facility reportedly kicked him out just hours after he showed up due to his poor attitude) led many NFL teams to pass on him in the 2011 draft.

Detroit Lions
After making the 2011 roster, Young was primarily used as the team's 2nd wide receiver, and played frequently in three-WR sets. On October 30 in a 45–10 defeat of the Denver Broncos, Young caught 4 passes for 66 yards, including his first career receiving touchdown. He caught two passes for touchdowns in a 45–41 loss to the Green Bay Packers on New Year's Day. Young was named the Lions-Detroit Sports Broadcasters Association Rookie of the Year for 2011.

However, his personality changed dramatically as the season wore on. He was noticeably quieter than he had been earlier in the season, and he became increasingly undisciplined on the field. This culminated in a Week 13 game against the New Orleans Saints, when he shoved safety Malcolm Jenkins in the face, drawing an unsportsmanlike conduct penalty. He was benched for the rest of the game. There were other, less public incidents that led someone in Young's inner circle to ask the league for help. The league offered counseling, but Young turned it down.

On May 21, 2012, the Lions sent Young home for two weeks after he sucker-punched Louis Delmas. On November 19, the Lions sent him home again for his behavior the previous day against the Green Bay Packers. According to Lions coaches, Young deliberately lined up in the wrong position twice and got into a verbal confrontation with receivers coach Shawn Jefferson. It was the last meaningful game Young ever played. He was deactivated for the team's Thanksgiving Day game a week later against the Houston Texans, as well as the next week's game against the Indianapolis Colts. 

On December 5, the Lions placed Young on injured reserve, ending his season. To express his frustration, Young tweeted about not wanting to play anymore if he did not get the ball. A little more than a month later, on February 4, the Lions released Young.

St. Louis Rams
On February 5, 2013, Young was claimed off waivers by the St. Louis Rams. The Rams were the only team that turned in a waiver claim for Young. However, he was released 10 days later, with the Rams saying they wanted to go "in a different direction". According to Sports Illustrated, the Rams cut ties with him due to concerns about his behavior. He seemed lost in interviews with head coach Jeff Fisher and other team personnel, and threw a fit when he was briefly barred from boarding a flight to Los Angeles after forgetting his ID.

Legal troubles
On May 5, 2013, Young was arrested twice in the same day. He was arrested for suspected drunk driving, and 14 hours later he was arrested for attempting to steal his impounded car from the tow yard. Later that week on May 10, Young was arrested for a third time and charged on suspicion of burglary, resisting arrest and assaulting an officer in San Clemente, California.

On May 13, 2013, Young's father, Richard, revealed his son has a severe mental disorder and badly needed help. According to Sports Illustrated, Young's family briefly checked him into Resnick Neuropsychiatric Hospital at UCLA shortly after the Rams released him. He also briefly spent time at a facility in Detroit. Several people close to Young believed that his problems stem from concussions. He suffered at least one concussion in high school; University High players frequently led with their heads in a time when the dangers of that practice were not well known. He also claimed to have suffered concussions in college, and may have suffered one or two in his rookie year with the Lions. Richard Young believes his son's brain was compressed in the front of his skull at one point.

On August 27, 2013, a California judge issued a bench warrant for Titus Young's arrest after Young missed a court hearing on charges of burglary and attempted burglary. 

On December 18, 2013, Orange County prosecutors revealed that the criminal case against Young was close to being settled, but Young's trial was delayed again when he was hospitalized for "unspecified treatment." 

Young was arrested again on July 9, 2014, on five counts of battery. He was held in Los Angeles on $105,000 bail. In December 2014, a judge ordered that Young must stand trial. In May 2015, Young was sentenced to one year of inpatient treatment at a rehabilitation center in Escondido, California, and five years' probation.

Young was arrested on charges of assault with a deadly weapon and felony battery following a January 30, 2016, street fight in Los Angeles.
On April 10, 2017, he was sentenced to 4 years in prison. He was released from prison on December 19, 2018.

Mental and brain health 
Due to his personality changes, Young admitted he hears voices telling him to commit crimes, and it has been noted that he could have CTE due to multiple head traumas. He was diagnosed with bipolar disorder in 2013.

Career statistics

References

External links
 

1989 births
Living people
American football wide receivers
American people convicted of assault
Boise State Broncos football players
Detroit Lions players
Players of American football from Los Angeles